Cryptochile elegans is a species of darkling beetles in the subfamily Pimeliinae. It is found in Kenya.

References

External links 

 Cryptochile elegans at insectoid.info

Pimeliinae
Beetles described in 1854
Fauna of Kenya